XHTM-TDT is a television station licensed to and broadcasting from Altzomoni, State of Mexico on virtual channel 10. Founded in 1952, it was the second television station built outside of Mexico City and the first relayer of Las Estrellas.

XHTM, along with Canal 5 transmitter XEX, serves one of Mexico's largest television service areas with a string of transmitters stretching from Taxco de Alarcón, Guerrero to Tlaxcala, Tlaxcala, including transmitters in Pachuca, Hidalgo, Cuernavaca, Morelos and San Martín Texmelucan, Puebla. XHTM's digital transmitter was initially located at Televisa's Puebla transmitter site along with the digital operations of its Altzomoni sister stations and both analog and digital signals of Televisa's Puebla independent XHP-TV; in 2015, final digital facilities were built on Altzomoni, coinciding with a power increase from 45 kW to 236.

History
XHTM channel 10 started life with a different callsign and channel number. In late 1952, XEQ-TV channel 9 took to the air; owned by Emilio Azcárraga and bearing the callsign of his XEQ AM radio in Mexico City, it was the second television station outside of the nation's capital (preceded only by XELD-TV in Matamoros) and the nation's fourth. The original concessionaire was Radio Panamericana, S.A., making it a direct sister station to XEQ radio. The sign-on of XEQ-TV was the first step in the development of a national relay network, reaching an additional three million people. Not long after, Romulo O'Farrill built his own relay station on the mountain, XEX-TV. The establishment of XEQ thus led to Televisa's massive system of relay stations covering most of Mexico.

In 1985, XEX-TV and XEQ-TV were affected by a series of moves that added a VHF channel to the Mexico City area. Mexico City had channel 8, then known as XHTM-TV. XHTM moved to channel 9, taking on the XEQ-TV callsign. A new television station was placed on channel 7, Imevisión's XHIMT-TV. To accomplish this move, XEX-TV was relocated to channel 8 and XEQ-TV to channel 10, picking up the XHTM callsign discarded in Mexico City.

In 1994, XEX and XHTM were joined on the mountain by a third Televisa station, XHATZ-TV (channel 32), as part of a 62-station concession used to help take XEQ-TV's signal national.

Digital operations for Televisa's Altzomoni stations—XEX, XHTM and XHATZ—were based in Puebla proper until 2015.

Repeaters
XHTM operates one of Mexico's most extensive networks of repeaters:

|-

|-

|-

|-

|-

|-

|-

|-

|-

|-

|}

References

External links
 Televisa Puebla

Television stations in Puebla
Television stations in Tlaxcala
Television stations in Morelos 
Television stations in Hidalgo 
Television stations in the State of Mexico 
Television stations in Guerrero 
Spanish-language television stations in Mexico
Las Estrellas transmitters
Television channels and stations established in 1952